Bonner Platz is an U-Bahn station in Munich on the U3.

References

Munich U-Bahn stations
Railway stations in Germany opened in 1972
1972 establishments in West Germany